Nello Melli (1923–1986) was an Argentine film editor.

Selected filmography
 You Are My Love (1941)
 White Eagle (1941)
 The Yacht Isabel Arrived This Afternoon (1949)
 Emergency Ward (1952)
 The ABC of Love (1967)

References

Bibliography 
 Rist, Peter H. Historical Dictionary of South American Cinema. Rowman & Littlefield, 2014.

External links 
 

1923 births
1986 deaths
Argentine film editors
People from Buenos Aires